Andrew or Andy Hay may refer to:
 Andrew Hay (British Army officer) (1762–1814), British Army officer
 Andrew Hay (footballer) (1909–?), Scottish footballer
 Andrew K. Hay (1809–1881), American Whig politician
 Andy Hay (rugby league) (born 1973), rugby league player and coach
 Andy Hay (rowing) (born 1964), New Zealand rowing coxswain
 Andrew Hay, 8th Earl of Erroll (1531–1585), Scottish nobleman and politician
 Andrew Leith Hay (1785–1862), Scottish soldier, politician and writer on architecture
 Andrew Hay (moderator) (1540–1593), Scottish minister